Vavilla Ramaswamy Sastrulu (1812–1891) was a Telugu Pundit and owner of the Telugu publishing house Saraswati Mudralayamu, which was later renamed Vavilla Press. The Vavilla family in Andhra Pradesh secured a page in history as a premier publishing house owning a press.

Birth and childhood
Ramaswamy Sastrulu was born at Vavilla, a village near Allur, Nellore District.

First printing press in Telugu
Vavilla Ramaswamy Sastrulu started the Telugu press in 1854 in Chennai in a press named Hindu Bhasha Sanjeevini. Later he established Adi Saraswathi Nilayam. During his lifetime till 1891, he published about 50 important books in Telugu and Sanskrit languages. Even C. P. Brown appreciated his efforts, stating: "In days when people had to read books written by hand, V.Ramaswamy Sastrulu relieved their difficulties by starting a printing press". It was later handled by his son Vavilla Venkateswara Sastrulu, who improved it greatly, printing more than 900 books in Telugu, Tamil and English.

References

Trilinga Rajatotsava Samputamu, sri vavilla venkateswara shastry. 1941, Vavilla Press.

External links
 Vavilla press in The Great Indian patriots by P. Rajeshwar Rao.

Telugu people
People from Nellore district
1812 births
1891 deaths
Indian publishers (people)
Businesspeople from Andhra Pradesh
19th-century Indian businesspeople